Black Rubber Shoes (Korean romanization: Geomjeong Gomusin) is a Korean animated television show for children. The stories take place in the city of Seoul in the sixties/seventies of the 20th century. The title refers to black gomusin, shoes made of rubber which children frequently had to wear because they were cheap and lasted for long times.

The background of the animation is based on Mapo, Seoul. Since first broadcast in 1999, it has become beloved by many children. It was broadcast on KBS 2 TV. The original version is a comic by Lee Woo-Young. The first broadcast for a special for Lunar New Year's Day program was so popular that it was made into a new series from 2000~2004.

The cartoon describes poverty and difficulties in the Korea of the 1960s. The main characters are Giyoung and his older brother Gichul, a middle school student. Even though they are poor, Gichul and Giyoung always live happily and have fun. The episodes of the brothers and family arouse nostalgia and memories about the past in many older Korean viewers. Black Rubber Shoes is considered one of the best works of Korean animation. The show is known catch people's attention regardless of sex or age.

It was nominated as a 'Best Program' by the Korean Broadcasting Commission and recognized as a 'Common Good Animation' in September, 2004.

In addition, the Seoul YMCA Association of Children's Culture chose it as a 'Good Program Selected by Children'.

Synopsis
The story focuses on a Korean family that lives in 1960s Seoul. In the 60s, South Korea was still a developing country with many of its citizens living in poverty. Because of this, there are a lot of references to that time period such as the street vendors and the school bread deliveries.

Characters
 Igiyeong (이기영) 

The second son of the family and the main character of the show Born 1960 (age 10 in the television)
 Igichul (이기철)

Older brother of Gi Yeong. Born 1956 (age 14). He is greedy.
 Chunsim (춘심)

Mother of Lee Gi Yeong, Lee Gi Cheol, Lee Oh Deok. Born 1929, age 40.
 Imalyong (말룡)
 Idckchon
 Jungunyun
Father of Lee Gi Yeong, Lee Gi Cheol, Lee Oh Deok. Born 1927, age 42.
 Ioduck (이오덕)
Youngest of the family and sister of Gi Yeong and Gi Cheol (age 1). First appeared in 2005.
 Junsungchul (전성철)
Friend of Lee Gi Yeong
 Kimdosng (김도승)
Friend of Lee Gi Yeong

and so on.
 Backgyungju
 Handahye
 Yanghwizun
 Gominho
 Gongocsoon
 IYungil
 Ihwisun
 Gichul's Teacher 
 Giyeong's Teacher

History
The show started in 1999 and is now broadcast on the Korean network Tooniverse and KBS.

On November 19, 2020, it was released exclusively at CGV under the theatrical version titled "The Black Rubber Shoes of Memories". Starting with the series of cartoons, it was the first time in 28 years that a theatrical version was made, and even with a TV animation as the starting point, it was the first theatrical version in 20 years.

Animation 
The animation was produced and invested by Korea Broadcasting Corporation, Saehan Production, Hoseo University, and Hoseo Venture Investment (a company invested by Hoseo University), while KBS Media acted as a PR and business window.

After making its debut as a special broadcast on New Year's Day in 1999 on Korean Broadcasting, the first TV series with 13 episodes was produced and aired in 2000. After that, it aired every Wednesday from June 16, 2004, to January 5, 2005.

(Second TV series) Some content was re-broadcast from May 25, 2005, to June 30, 2005, due to viewers' request for rebroadcast, and a new TV series was produced and aired in mid-May 2005. Like the original cartoon, the animation mainly dealt with the growing up of the brothers, and the special feature 〈The Ordeal of Barley Mountain〉, a trilogy, tells the story of overcoming difficulties due to sudden unemployment of the father through family love.

From October 28, 2009, to November 11, 2009, and Children's Day (HD version), the episode was re-broadcast from May 1, 2013, to May 3, 2013. In 2015, the 4 black rubber shoes, which were jointly produced by reuniting with Hyeongseol-N after 10 years, aired from May 11th to August 10th.

References

External links
 Show's KBS homepage 

1990s South Korean animated television series
2000s South Korean animated television series
South Korean children's animated television series